Heinz Winkler may refer to:
 Heinz Winkler (politician) (1910–1958), East German Christian Democratic politician
 Heinz Winkler (chef) (1949–2022), Italian-German chef

See also
 Heinz Winckler, South African singer